Dwight Larte Lowery (born January 23, 1986) is a former American football safety. He was drafted by the New York Jets in the fourth round of the 2008 NFL Draft. He played college football at San Jose State.

Early years
Lowery attended Soquel High School in Soquel, California where he was an All Santa Cruz Coast Athletic League running back for the Knights during his senior year. Lowery broke the school's scoring record for a single season (25 touchdowns) and the County's single game scoring record (7 TD; 5 rushing, 1 receiving and a returned interception for the games final he earned All-League defensive back his junior and senior year having 20 interceptions in 20 games.

Lowery also played basketball and was a 3-year starter on the varsity squad. He earned league MVP honors his junior year, and lead his team into the Central Coast Section Playoffs.

College career

Cabrillo College
Lowery previously attended Cabrillo College in Aptos, California where he played Free Safety and special teams for the Seahawks. During Lowery's Freshman season at Cabrillo College, he received All State defensive back honors and lead California in INTs (9). His Sophomore season was cut short with a hand injury but he still managed four more interceptions in the games following the injury. He left Cabrillo with 13 picks in 15 games. He also led the state in return yards in 2004.

San Jose State

Lowery was a two-time All-America selection AFCA and FWAA All-America cornerback for San Jose State University. Lowery led the nation in 2006 with 9 interceptions. In his senior season at San Jose State University Lowery recorded 4 interceptions and was named to the all-WAC team in 2007. In the post-season 83rd East–West Shrine Game, Lowery had 2 interceptions.

Lowery had applied for a draft grade from the NFL's advisory committee following the 2006 season but decided that he would return in 2007 for his Senior season at SJSU.

Awards and honors
Named to the 2007 Playboy All-American Team.
Named to the 2006 and 2007 AFCA All-America Team
Named to the 2007 Scout.com All-America Third-team
Earned All-WAC first-team Honors in 2007
Became the first player in San Jose State University history to be named an All-American in back-to-back years.
Named to 83rd East-West Shrine All-Star Game in 2008

Professional career

New York Jets

Impressed with Lowery's versatility and ball skills, the New York Jets would draft him in the fourth round (113th overall) of the 2008 NFL Draft as a cornerback/safety. An injury to cornerback Justin Miller would see Lowery debut in his first NFL game against the Miami Dolphins; Lowery performed modestly with four tackles and three passes defensed. Lowery was named to the NFL's mid-season all-rookie team for his efforts on defense however in November, Lowery was benched in favor of veteran Ty Law. In spite of the benching, Lowery continued to improve and contribute as a backup cornerback earning the praise of his head coach Eric Mangini and his teammates.

In 2009, Lowery continued to contribute as a backup and would finish the season with 24 tackles, 9 passes defensed and 3 interceptions.

In 2010, Lowery would record his first career touchdown, intercepting Brett Favre on a play that would seal the Jets' victory over the Vikings.

Jacksonville Jaguars
Lowery was traded to the Jacksonville Jaguars for an undisclosed draft pick on September 3, 2011. In his first game with Jacksonville, Lowery intercepted a Matt Hasselbeck pass to seal a Jaguar victory.

On March 13, 2012, Lowery agreed to a four-year extension with the Jaguars. He was placed on season-ending injured reserve on December 22, 2012.

In week 2 of the 2012 season during the Jaguars home opener loss to the Houston Texans, Lowery tackled a fan who ran onto the field.

Lowery's 2013 season ended when he was placed on injured reserve on October 8. He was released from injured reserve on November 4.

Atlanta Falcons
Lowery signed with the Atlanta Falcons on April 8, 2014. 
Lowery helped contribute to a struggling Atlanta Falcons defense in 2014. Lowery replaced old Atlanta Falcons Free Safety Thomas Decoud and did  an outstanding job.

Indianapolis Colts
Lowery signed with the Indianapolis Colts on April 3, 2015.

San Diego Chargers
On March 9, 2016, Lowery signed a three-year contract with the San Diego Chargers. Lowery was signed to fill any empty void previously filled by All-Pro safety Eric Weddle.

On September 2, 2017, Lowery was released by the Chargers.

NFL statistics
'''

Post-playing career
In 2018, Lowery was named the head football coach at Soquel High School, his alma mater.

Personal life
Lowery was born to Tracy Rivers who raised him as single mother. Lowery has six other siblings, including a sister, Aujanae. Lowery is married to his wife, Ashley Lowery.

References

External links
Los Angeles Chargers bio
San José State Spartans bio

1986 births
Living people
Sportspeople from Santa Cruz, California
Players of American football from California
African-American players of American football
American football cornerbacks
American football safeties
Cabrillo Seahawks football players
San Jose State Spartans football players
New York Jets players
Jacksonville Jaguars players
Atlanta Falcons players
Indianapolis Colts players
San Diego Chargers players
Los Angeles Chargers players
21st-century African-American sportspeople
20th-century African-American people